2000 World Junior Championships may refer to:

 Athletics: 2000 World Junior Championships in Athletics
 Figure skating: 2000 World Junior Figure Skating Championships
 Ice hockey: 2000 World Junior Ice Hockey Championships
 Motorcycle speedway: 2000 Individual Speedway Junior World Championship

See also
 2000 World Cup (disambiguation)
 2000 Continental Championships (disambiguation)
 2000 World Championships (disambiguation)